Sean McGuire (26 December 1927 – 24 March 2005) was a former All Ireland fiddle champion. He was from Belfast.

Discography

Seán McGuire and Roger Sherlock, Two Champions, Outlet SOLP 1002. Released under at least two other titles, including as Sean McGuire, Irish Traditional Fiddling Outlet SOLP 1002, 1969. With Roger Sherlock (flute), Josephine Keegan (piano). Recorded in Belfast. Later reissued as Outlet PTICD 1002. .
Seán McGuire and Josephine Keegan, Champion of Champions, Outlet SOLP 1005, 1969 (also as audiocassette). Reissued as Outlet PTICD 1005.
Seán McGuire, Traditional Irish Fiddle, Outlet SOLP 1006. Also issued as The Best of Sean McGuire Outlet OLP 1006, 1971. Reissued as Outlet PTICD 1006.
Seán McGuire and Roger Sherlock with Josephine Keegan, At Their Best, Outlet SOLP 1008, 1970 or 1971. L
Seán McGuire and Joe Burke. Two Champions, SOLP 1014, 1971. Also issued as Seán McGuire and Joe Burke. .
Seán McGuire, Ireland’s Champion Fiddler, Outlet SOLP 1031. Reissued as PTICD 3031.
Seán McGuire, Man of Achievement, Top Spin, 1975. Reissued as Outlet PTICD 1052, 1988.
Seán McGuire, From the Archives, Outlet OAS 3017, 1979. .
Seán and Jim McGuire, Brothers Together, Outlet PTICD 1055, 1994 also issued by Outlet or catalogued by libraries under the alternate title Pure traditional Irish fiddle music.
Seán McGuire, Hawks and Doves of Irish Culture, PTICD 1089.

Included in compilations:

Airs of Ireland, Outlet SOLP 1035, 1977.
Festival of Traditional Irish Music, Outlet Records CHCD 1037, 1994.

References

External links
 Interview by Ken Perlman, "Sean McGuire: Master of The Irish Violin"
 "Sean McGuire" article at Rambling House

1927 births
2005 deaths
Fiddlers from Northern Ireland
Folk musicians from Northern Ireland
Musicians from Belfast
20th-century violinists